Sardar SadaqAt Ali abbasi Abbasi is a Pakistani politician who had been a member of the National Assembly of Pakistan from August 2018 till January 2023. He belongs to Tehsil Murree of District Rawalpindi.

Education
He has a degree of Master of Science in economics which he received from the International Islamic University, Islamabad. He also has a degree of Master of Philosophy in economics as well a degree of Master of Science in IT.

Prior to entering politics, he taught economics to A Levels students in Islamabad, and served as the Pakistan Tehreek-e-Insaf head of Khyber Pakhtunkhwa's education think-tank.

Political career
He is candidate of Pakistan Tehreek-e-Insaf (PTI) from Constituency NA-57 (Rawalpindi-I) in 2018 Pakistani general election. He received 136,249 votes and defeated Shahid Khaqan Abbasi.

References

Living people
Pakistani MNAs 2018–2023
Pakistan Tehreek-e-Insaf politicians
Year of birth missing (living people)

4 . aneesabbasi